Afroarabiella ochracea is a moth in the family Cossidae. It is found in the Democratic Republic of Congo and Tanzania.

References

Natural History Museum Lepidoptera generic names catalog

Cossinae
Moths described in 1929
Moths of Africa